George Bartholomew was an American inventor who is credited with the invention of concrete pavement.  In 1886, Bartholomew moved to Bellefontaine, Ohio, after having learned about cement production.  Bartholomew found a good source of limestone and clay in the area; from this, he hoped to create an artificial stone for paving.  Bartholomew founded the Buckeye Portland Cement Company and set about developing a new cement for pavement.

In 1891, the Bellefontaine city council approved the use of Bartholomew's invention for paving a test strip on Main Street outside the Logan County courthouse.  This experiment proved successful, and the council approved the pavement of Court Avenue.  A section of Court Avenue remains paved today with Bartholomew's formula, celebrated as the first concrete paved street in America.

Bartholomew was honored for his invention at the World Columbian Exposition in Chicago, Illinois in 1893. His award was titled, "First Place for Engineering Technology Advancement in Paving Materials."  This award lent credibility to Bartholomew's technique, and it was quickly adopted throughout the United States and internationally.

External links
 "Oldest Concrete Street in the United States" Concrete International March 2002

19th-century American inventors
People from Bellefontaine, Ohio
Year of birth missing
Year of death missing